Charles Dennison Sweet (July 16, 1858 – September 9, 1900), or C. D. Sweet, was an American politician, who was the sixth Mayor of Orlando from 1880 to 1881.

References

Mayors of Orlando, Florida
1858 births
1900 deaths
19th-century American politicians